Whitefield Academy is a Kindergarten preparatory - Grade 12 private classical Christian school located in Kansas City, Missouri, United States.

History 

Whitefield Academy KC is a Christian, classical, independent, non-denominational, private school established in 1995.  Serving families and students age 4 through 12th grade, the school seeks to train children to become compassionate leaders, critical thinkers and clear communicators.  ref></ref>

Young people who love to learn and learn how to learn make up the student body. An intentionally loving school environment, academically excellent faculty who mentor their students, and a strong and vibrant community are key elements that make Whitefield the exceptional and unique educational experience that it is.

Whitefield Academy documents state that all people are created in God's image and should be treated equally. Their statement of faith outlines Christian faith and practice. <ref>https://whitefieldacademykc.org/statement-of-faith//ref>

Demographics
The demographic breakdown of the 280 Pre-K-12 students enrolled for school year 2021-2022 was:

Asian - 9.6%
Black - 9.7%
Hispanic - 10.2&
White - 67.4%
Other - 3.1

References

External links 
Whitefield Academy's website

1995 establishments in Missouri
Christian schools in Missouri
Classical Christian schools
Educational institutions established in 1995
High schools in Kansas City, Missouri
Private elementary schools in Missouri
Private high schools in Missouri
Private middle schools in Missouri